Alexandra Hedison (born July 10, 1969) is an American photographer, director, and actress. She is married to actress and filmmaker Jodie Foster.

Early life
Born in Los Angeles, California, on July 10, 1969, she is the daughter of Bridget (Mori) and the actor David Hedison. Hedison is of Italian and Armenian heritage. She attended the State University of New York at Purchase and University of California, Los Angeles (UCLA).

Career
Alexandra Hedison is a fine art photographer. Hedison first exhibited her series of abstract landscapes in 2002 at Rose Gallery in Bergamot Station, Los Angeles with others.

As a photographer, in 2005, she exhibited the (Re)Building series, which addressed themes of loss, transition and recovery while using construction as a metaphor for memory in the architecture of the subconscious. Her series of large format photographs entitled Ithaka, which takes its title from the CP Cavafy poem of the same name, was shot in the temperate rain forest of North America. First exhibited in London, Ithaka was included in The New Yorkers 2008 Passport to the Arts and Month of Photography Los Angeles the following year.

Hedison's work is represented in public and private collections worldwide, and her photographs have been shown in solo and group exhibitions in galleries and museums throughout the US and Europe, including Los Angeles, New York, and London.

Hedison was selected by Barclays Capital for international sponsorship in 2008.

In 2009 Hedison published a series of books sponsored by the Center of Cultural Intelligence in Singapore.

In 2009, the Ithaka series was exhibited at Frank Pictures Gallery in Santa Monica. This exhibition was the Month of Photography Los Angeles (MOPLA) Official Opening Night Exhibition, in conjunction with Pro'jekt LA. In 2010, her solo show "In the Woods" was exhibited at Meredith Gunderson Projects in London. The same year Hedison showed Ithaka in a solo exhibit at Mews 42 Gallery in London.

In 2011, Hedison did a residency with Myriam Blundell Projects at the Willums Art Foundation in Pourrieres, France.

In 2012, her work series "Everybody Knows This Is Nowhere" was exhibited in a solo show at Diane Rosenstein Gallery in Beverly Hills.

In 2013, Hedison was selected to be part of the "My Aim Is True" exhibition at the Frostig Collection in Los Angeles.

In 2013, Hedison was part of "First Anniversary - Exhibition of Paintings and Sculpture and Photographs" at Diane Rosenstein Fine Art, Los Angeles, in a group exhibition with others.

In 2016 Hedison exhibited in "Both Sides of Sunset - Photographs of Los Angeles" at Kopeikin Gallery in Los Angeles, along with others.

In 2016 "Everybody Knows This Is Nowhere" opened at the Centro Cultural de Cascais in Cascais, Portugal, an exhibit that included photography and film installations. The show in was named in Time Out magazine as one of the top ten exhibitions in Lisbon during the year.

In 2017 Hedison and Jodie Foster co-chaired the 14th edition of the Hammer Museum's annual Gala in the Garden.

Hedison has also appeared in multiple television series including Showtime's The L Word as con artist Dylan Moreland.

Personal life
Hedison was in a relationship with comedian and talk show host Ellen DeGeneres from 2000 to 2004. In April 2014, Hedison married Jodie Foster, after dating for a year.

Filmography

Sleep with Me (1994) as Brunette Actress
Lois & Clark: The New Adventures of Superman (1994) as Remy
The Hard Truth (1994) as TII receptionist
Melrose Place (1995) as Dr. Reshay
OP Center (1995) as C-5 Tech #1
Max is Missing (1995) as Rebecca
The Rich Man's Wife (1996) as Party Guest
L.A. Firefighters (1996) as Firefighter Kay Rizzo
Tomorrow Never Dies (1997) as news reporter on video tape
Any Day Now (1998) as Rhonda
Prey (1998) as Attwood's Boss
Blackout Effect (1998) as Catherine Parmel
Standing on Fishes (1999) as Jason's Girlfriend
Seven Days (1999) as First Lt. Sally Bensen
Nash Bridges (2000) as Special Agent Victoria Trachsel
In the Dog House (2005) as The Voice of Maggie
Designing Blind (2006) (A&E) as Alexandra Hedison
The L Word (2006 and 2009) as Dylan Moreland

Films as director
 In the Dog House (2005), animated
 The Making of Suit Yourself (2005), documentary

References

External links

 
 

1969 births
21st-century LGBT people
21st-century American women
Actresses from Los Angeles
American film actresses
Photographers from California
American stage actresses
American television actresses
American people of Armenian descent
Living people
University of California, Los Angeles alumni
Film directors from California
American women photographers
LGBT people from California
American lesbian actresses
LGBT film directors
Armenian LGBT people
American documentary filmmakers
American LGBT photographers
State University of New York at Purchase alumni
American women documentary filmmakers
American people of Italian descent